Zadek is a surname. Notable people with the surname include:

Hilde Zadek (1917–2019), German operatic soprano
Peter Zadek (1926–2009), German theatre and film director
Simon Zadek (born 1967), writer and advisor focused on business and sustainability
Walter Zadek (1900–1992), Israeli photographer

cs:Zadek
de:Zadek
ru:Цадек